Nikolaus Correll (born 1977 in Munich, Germany) is a roboticist and an associate professor at the University of Colorado at Boulder in the Department of Computer Science with courtesy appointments in the departments of Aerospace, Electrical and Materials Engineering. Nikolaus is the faculty director of the Interdisciplinary Research Theme on Multi-functional Materials at the College of Engineering and Applied Science, and the founder and CTO of Robotic Materials Inc.

Biography
Correll obtained a Diploma (Masters) in Electrical Engineering from the Eidgenössische Technische Hochschule Zürich. He spent the first two years of his studies at the Technische Hochschule München, participated in the Erasmus Programme to spend a semester at Lunds Tekniska Hogsköla working with Rolf Johansson and wrote his Diploma thesis at Caltech working with Alcherio Martinoli and Joel Burdick.

Correll received his Dr. és science (Phd) degree in Computer Science in 2007 at the École polytechnique fédérale de Lausanne (EPFL) working under Alcherio Martinoli. Correll did a post-doc with Prof. Daniela Rus at Massachusetts Institute of Technology's Computer Science and Artificial Intelligence Laboratory.  He became an assistant professor at the University of Colorado at Boulder in 2009, and was promoted to Associate Professor with tenure  in 2017.

Correll is the recipient of a 2012 NSF CAREER award, the 2012 NASA Early Career Faculty Fellowship, and a 2016 Provost Faculty Achievement Award. He is a senior member of the IEEE.

Work
Correll's research is on Swarm Robotics, Swarm Intelligence, and Self-organization. He is using these concepts to equip composite materials with intelligence and enabling robots with autonomy, for which he coined the term Robotic Materials and founded a company of the same name, which markets robotic manipulation systems based on smart tactile sensors, skins and hands.

Correll is also an active researcher in robotics education and is the author of an open-source, collaborative textbook "Introduction to Autonomous Robots".

Correll's work on robotic materials has received worldwide media attention including the Associated Press, Neue Zuercher Zeitung, the IEEE Signal Processing Magazine, and Popular Science, among others.

In addition to serving as CEO of Robotic Materials Inc., Correll has been an advisor to TempAlert (acquired, NASDAQ: DGII), TABS, and Occam Robotics, and currently to Robotise SE.

Academic Heritage
Since starting at the University of Colorado in 2009, two of Correll's former PhD students have taken up faculty jobs at PhD-granting institutions:

 Erik Komendera, PhD 2014, Assistant Professor in Mechanical Engineering at Virginia Tech
 Michael Otte, PhD 2011, Assistant Professor in Aerospace Engineering at the University of Maryland, College Park

Honors
 Keynote Speaker at the Int. Conf. on Intelligent Robots and Systems (IROS), 2020
 Provost Faculty Achievement Award, University of Colorado at Boulder, 2016
 Plenary speaker at the Int. Symposium on Distributed Autonomous Robotic Systems (DARS), 2016
 Best Paper Award at the 3rd Conference on System-integrated Intelligence (SysInt), 2016
 Best Paper Award at the Int. Symposium on Distributed Autonomous Robotic Systems (DARS) 2006 and 2014
 NSF CAREER award 2012
 NASA Early Career Faculty Fellowship 2012
 Best Paper Award at the Int. Conference on the Simulation of Adaptive Behavior (SAB), 2008

References

External links
 Correll lab at the University of Colorado

1977 births
German roboticists
German computer scientists
Technical University of Munich alumni
University of Colorado Boulder faculty
ETH Zurich alumni
École Polytechnique Fédérale de Lausanne alumni
Living people
Scientists from Munich